Frances Minto Elliot  (1820–1898) was a prolific English writer, primarily of non-fiction works on the social history of Italy, Spain, and France and travelogues. She also wrote three novels and published art criticism and gossipy, sometimes scandalous, sketches for The Art Journal, Bentley's Miscellany, and The New Monthly Magazine, often under the pseudonym, "Florentia". Largely forgotten now, she was very popular in her day, with multiple re-printings of her books in both Europe and the United States. Elliot had a wide circle of literary friends including Charles Dickens, Anthony Trollope and Wilkie Collins. Collins dedicated his 1872 novel, Poor Miss Finch, to her, and much of the content in Marian Holcolmbe's conversations in The Woman in White is said to be based on her.

Biography

Frances Vickriss Dickinson was born at Farley Hill Court in the Berkshire village of Swallowfield on 6 March 1820. She was the only child from Catherine Allingham's marriage to Charles Dickinson of Queen Charlton Manor, Somerset. She was an 18-year-old heiress when her life began to take its somewhat complicated path. On 8 October 1838, she married John Edward Geils from Glasgow in the Swallowfield church. The couple then departed for Scotland, but the marriage proved to be a disaster. After seven years, she left her husband and returned to Farley Hill Court, alleging his adultery with two of their maids, and violence towards her. He, in turn, tried to deny her access to their four daughters and sued her for the "restitution of his conjugal rights". In 1855 she was finally able to obtain a divorce in the Scottish courts and regain custody of the children, although the case had been fought all the way to the House of Lords before it was finalised. Despite the fact that she was the innocent party in the divorce, she found herself socially ostracised from the upper-class circles in which she had once moved and travelled to Italy, where she was eventually to spend a large part of her life. According to the 1896 edition of her book, Roman Gossip, one of the daughters from her first marriage (also named Frances) later married the Italian archaeologist and art historian, Marchese Chigi.

During the protracted divorce proceedings, she worked as a journalist for several London magazines and became friends with Wilkie Collins, who also wrote for Bentley's Miscellany. It was through Collins that she met Charles Dickens. Collins had asked her to play in the 1857 amateur performances of The Frozen Deep, a play he had co-written with Dickens. In December 1863 she married the Very Rev. Gilbert Elliot, Dean of Bristol, a widower twenty years her senior with three children from his first wife. However, within three years, that marriage was also in serious trouble. She eventually left Elliot and returned to Italy, although the couple were never legally separated or divorced. She continued to use her married name as an author, incorporating "Minto" for good measure, especially in British publications. Gilbert Elliot had family connections with the Earls of Minto – her 1873 book, Old Court Life in France, is dedicated to "My niece The Countess of Minto".

Francis Minto Elliot died in Siena on 26 October 1898, aged 78. She is buried in the Protestant Cemetery in Rome near the grave of her second daughter, Mary Lucy, who had died in Rome in 1855 at the age of 13.

Selected works

Frances Elliot's work was published under a variety of names during her lifetime: "Frances Geils", "Frances Vickriss Dickinson", "Florentia", "Frances Elliot", "Mrs. Elliot", and "Frances Minto Elliot". In addition to numerous articles in magazines and journals, she wrote the following books:

Non-fiction
Old Court Life in France. London: Ward & Downey, 1886
 Old Court Life in Spain. London: Chapman & Hall, 1893
 Pictures of Old Rome. London: Chapman & Hall, 1872  
 Roman Gossip. London: J. Murray, 1894
 Diary of an Idle Woman in Italy. London: Chapman & Hall, 1871
 Diary of an Idle Woman in Spain. Leipzig: Bernhard Tauchnitz, 1882 
 Diary of an Idle Woman in Sicily.  Leipzig: Bernhard Tauchnitz, 1882
 Diary of an Idle Woman in Constantinople. London: J. Murray, 1893
Fiction
 The Italians: A Novel. New York: D. Appleton, 1875
 The Red Cardinal: A Romance. London: F. V. White, 1884
 The Ill-tempered Cousin. London: F. V. White, 1885
The Story of Sophia. Leipzig: Bernard Tauchnitz, 1891.

Notes

References
Accademia di Danimarca, Protestant Cemetery, Rome: Burial records, Frances Elliot and Mary Lucy Geils. Accessed 9 March 2009.
Atlantic Monthly, Comment on New Books, Volume 73, Issue 436, February 1894, pp. 272–281.
Collins, Wilkie, The Evil Genius (Introduction and notes by Graham Law), Broadview Press, 1994, pp. 15–16. 
Elliot, Frances, Old Court Life in France, G. P. Putnam, 1893.
Elliot, Frances Minto, Roman Gossip, J. Murray, 1896
Gale, Robert L., A Henry James Encyclopedia, Greenwood Press, 1989, p. 204. 
Foyster, Elizabeth A. Marital Violence: An English Family History, 1660–1875, Cambridge University Press, 2005. 
Hall, N. John (ed.), The Letters of Anthony Trollope, Stanford University Press, 1983, p. 274. 
Hodgson, Barbara, No Place for a Lady: Tales of Adventurous Women Travelers, Ten Speed Press, 2002. 
House of Lords, Cases on Appeals and Writs of Error, Claims of Peerage, and Divorces: During the Sessions 1850–1852, Spettigue and Farrance, 1853, p. 280 and passim.
The New York Times, "English Literary Notes", 31 March 1877, p. 2.
The New York Times, "Days in Turkey's Capital" (Review of Elliot's Diary of an Idle Woman in Constantinople), 12 March 1893, p. 19.
The New York Times, "The Publishers: Plans of Some of Them", 9 May 1903, p. BR14.
The New York Times, "New York Book Announcements", 18 June 1910, p. BR12.
Peters, Catherine, The king of inventors: a life of Wilkie Collins, Secker & Warburg, 1991. 
Peters, Catherine, "Secondary Lives: Biography in Context in The Art of Literary Biography, John Batchelor (ed), Oxford University Press, 1995, pp. 43–56. 
Pfister, Manfred, The Fatal Gift of Beauty: The Italies of British Travellers (annotated anthology), Rodopi, 1996, p. 484. 
Rogal, Samuel J., Frances Minto (Dickinson) Elliot, Dictionary of Literary Biography, Thomson Gale, 2005–2006. Accessed online 8 March 2009.
Sternlieb, Lisa Ruth, The Female Narrator in the British Novel: Hidden Agendas, Palgrave, 2002. 
Storey, Graham (ed.), The Letters of Charles Dickens: Volume 12: 1868–1870, Oxford University Press, 2002.

External links
Public domain copies of works by Frances Minto Elliot
 
 
Old Court Life in France Publisher: Ward & Downey, 1886
Old Court Life in Spain Publisher: Chapman & Hall, 1893
Roman Gossip Publisher: J. Murray, 1894
Diary of an Idle Woman in Sicily Publisher: Bernhard Tauchnitz, Leipzig, 1882
Diary of an Idle Woman in Italy Publisher: Chapman & Hall, 1871
Diary of an Idle Woman in Constantinople Publisher: J. Murray, 1893
Diary of an Idle Woman in Spain Publisher: Bernhard Tauchnitz, Leipzig, 1882 
The Italians Publisher: Bernhard Tauchnitz, Leipzig, 1875
Pictures of Old Rome Publisher: Chapman & Hall, 1872
The Italians: A Novel Publisher: D. Appleton, 1875
The Red Cardinal: A Romance Publisher: F. V. White, 1884
The Ill-tempered Cousin, Vol. 1; Vol. 2; Vol. 3 Publisher: F. V. White, 1885
 "Diary of a first Winter in Rome – 1854" in The New Monthly Magazine Vol. 101, Chapman & Hall, London, 1854.
"The Baths of Lucca" in The New Monthly Magazine Vol. 109, Chapman & Hall, London, 1857.

English women non-fiction writers
English travel writers
19th-century English women writers
19th-century English writers
19th-century British writers
1820 births
1898 deaths
Burials in the Protestant Cemetery, Rome
British women travel writers